The 1985 King of the Ring was the inaugural King of the Ring professional wrestling tournament produced by the World Wrestling Federation (WWF, now WWE). The tournament was held on July 8, 1985 at the Sullivan Stadium in Foxborough, Massachusetts as a special non-televised house show. The inaugural 1985 tournament was won by Don Muraco. In addition to the tournament, there was only one other match during the night. In this match Hulk Hogan pinned Nikolai Volkoff to retain the WWF World Heavyweight Championship. The event drew 23,000 people of which 20,000 were paid.

Production

Background
In 1985, in an effort to boost attendance at their house shows, the World Wrestling Federation (WWF, now WWE) scheduled their July 8, 1985 event as a tournament called the King of the Ring. It was a single-elimination tournament in which the winner would be crowned the "King of the Ring." The inaugural tournament was held at the Sullivan Stadium in Foxborough, Massachusetts as a special non-televised house show.

Storylines
The matches resulted from scripted storylines, where wrestlers portrayed heroes, villains, or less distinguishable characters in scripted events that built tension and culminated in a wrestling match or series of matches. Results were predetermined by World Wrestling Federation's writers.

Aftermath
A second tournament was scheduled for 1986, also as a non-televised house show, thus establishing the King of the Ring tournament as an annual event. The event continued to be held as a special non-televised house show up through 1989 and in 1991; a tournament was not held in 1990. A tournament was also not held in 1992, but it returned in 1993, this time as a pay-per-view (PPV) entitled King of the Ring. Only the final few matches of the tournament took place at the PPV with the first few tournament matches being held prior to the PPV. The PPV would continue until 2002, the same year that the WWF was renamed to World Wrestling Entertainment (WWE), after which, the tournament would only be periodically held across episodes of Raw and SmackDown, although the final match of the 2006 tournament took place at the Judgment Day PPV, while the semifinals and finals of the 2015 tournament aired as a WWE Network-exclusive event.

Results

Tournament bracket

1.  Tito Santana fought Jim Brunzell to a time limit draw; Brunzell then won a coin toss to determine who would continue in the tournament.
 Hulk Hogan (c) defeated Nikolai Volkoff Singles match for the WWF World Heavyweight Championship 11:32

References

1985
1985 in professional wrestling
1985 in Massachusetts
Professional wrestling in Massachusetts
Events in Foxborough, Massachusetts
Sports competitions in Foxborough, Massachusetts
July 1985 events in the United States